The Groningen–Delfzijl railway is a railway line in the Netherlands running from Groningen to Delfzijl, passing through Sauwerd, Loppersum and Appingedam. The line was opened in 1884.

Stations
The stations on the railway are:

Groningen: to Leeuwarden, Delfzijl and Nieuweschans 
Groningen Noord
Sauwerd: to Roodeschool
Bedum
Stedum
Loppersum: bus services 42, 45, 62, 660 and 662
Appingedam: bus services 40, 61, 78, 91, 95 and 140
Delfzijl West
Delfzijl: bus services 40, 43, 61, 96, 119, 140 and 245

Train service
Services are operated by Arriva. From Monday to Saturday trains run 2x per hour between 5am and 8pm. On all other times trains run 1x per hour

References

 www.sporenplan.nl
 Qbuzz, the operator of the bus services

Railway lines in Groningen (province)
Standard gauge railways in the Netherlands
Railway lines opened in 1884